Charles Joseph Édouard Potier, called Charles (Bordeaux, 1806 – Asnières-sur-Seine, 28 April 1870) was a 19th-century French actor and playwright.

A son of Charles-Gabriel Potier, an actor at the Théâtre des Variétés (1826), the Théâtre du Palais-Royal than at the Théâtre des Folies-Dramatiques, his plays were presented on the most significant Parisian stages of his time including the Théâtre des Délassements-Comiques, Théâtre des Folies-Dramatiques, Théâtre Déjazet.

Works 

 Les 20000 francs, drama in 1 act mingled with songs, with Auguste-Louis-Désiré Boulé, 1832
 La Fille du bourreau, folie-vaudeville in 1 act, with Boulé, 1833
 Le Peloton de fil, moralité in 1 act, mingled with couplets, 1834
 Parce que, ou la Suite de Pourquoi ? , comédie en vaudevilles in 1 act, with Boulé, 1835
 Fanchette, ou l'Amour d'une femme, drama-vaudeville in 2 acts, with Boulé, 1836
 Le Facteur, ou la Justice des hommes, drama in 5 acts, with Boulé and Charles Desnoyer, 1838
 La Sœur de l'ivrogne, drama-vaudeville in 1 act, with Désiré Gautier, 1839
 L'Amie et l'amant, ou La confiance du mari, comédie en vaudevilles in 1 act, with Hippolyte Rimbaut, 1840
 Le Bijoutier de Nuremberg, ou Elle me console, drama in 3 acts, with Adolphe Guénée, 1840
 Le Maître à tous, comedy in 2 acts mingled with singing, with Antony Béraud, 1840
 Léon, Georges et Marie, ou les Deux amours, comédie en vaudevilles in 1 act, with Félix Dutertre de Véteuil, 1841
 Le Marchand d'habits, drama in 5 acts, with Desnoyer, 1841
 Les Deux Joseph, comédie en vaudevilles in 1 act, with Nyon, 1842
 Tic, tac ! tic tac ! ou les Deux mariées, folie-vaudeville in 1 act, 1843
 À la belle étoile, comédie en vaudevilles in 1 act, with Édouard Brisebarre, 1844
 Estelle et Némorin, pastorale bouffonne in 2 acts, mingled with singing, with Michel Delaporte, 1844
 Le Mal du pays, drama-vaudeville in 3 parts, with Brisebarre, 1846
 Le Retour du conscrit, comédie en vaudevilles in 1 act, 1846
 Bal et bastringue, comédie en vaudevilles in 3 acts, with Brisebarre, 1847
 Deux loups de mer, comédie en vaudevilles in 1 act, with Brisebarre, 1847
 Sans dot !, comédie en vaudevilles in 1 act, with Brisebarre, 1847
 Tantale, comédie en vaudevilles in 1 act, with Brisebarre, 1847
 Élevés ensemble, comédie en vaudevilles in 1 act, with Narcisse Fournier, 1848
 L'Été de la Saint-Martin, comedy in 1 act, mingled with couplets, with Brisebarre, 1848
 Le Voyage de Nanette, drame-vaudeville in 3 acts and 4 tableaux, with Brisebarre, 1848
 Adrienne de Carotteville, ou La reine de la fantaisie, parody in un act of the 17th, 33th, 78th, 93th, 96th, 112th, 129th, and 168th episodes of the Juif errant, with Eugène Nyon and Brisebarre, 1849
 Les Fredaines de Troussard, comédie en vaudevilles in 1 act, with Brisebarre and Commerson, 1849
 Qui se dispute s'adore, proverb in 1 act, with Henry de Kock, 1850
 Un Coin du Palais de Cristal, à-propos-vaudeville in 1 act and 2 tableaux, with Théodore Faucheur, 1851
 Une Soirée agitée, comédie en vaudevilles in 1 act, with Faucheur, 1852
 Le Bonhomme Dimanche, revue-féerique in 4 acts and 20 tableaux, with Amédée de Jallais and Jules Renard, 1853
 Le Carton vivant, comédie en vaudevilles in 2 acts, with Alexandre Flan, 1853
 Un Homme seul, comédie en vaudevilles in 1 act, with Faucheur, 1853
 Un Monsieur seul, comédie en vaudevilles in 1 act, with Faucheur, 1853
 Où peut-on être mieux ?, comédie en vaudevilless in 1 act, with Paulin Deslandes, 1853
 Le Forgeron de Gretna-Green, comédie en vaudevilles in 2 acts, with Flan, 1854
 Où passerai-je mes soirées ?, comédie en vaudevilles in 1 act, with Gaston de Montheau, 1854
 Voilà ce qui vient de paraître, revue of the year 1854, in 3 acts and 16 tableaux, with Adolphe Guénée, 1854
 La Dame aux trois maris, comédie en vaudevilles in 1 act, with Guénée, 1855
 Dzing ! Boum ! Boum !, revue de l'Exposition, in 3 acts and 16 tableaux, with Guénée, 1855
 L'Enfant du petit monde, comédie en vaudevilles in 3 acts, with Guénée, 1855
 Vous allez voir ce que vous allez voir, revue of the year 1855, in 3 acts and 16 tableaux, with Guénée, 1855
 Allons-y gaiment, revue of the year 1856, in 3 acts and 14 tableaux, with Guénée, 1856
 Les Dragées du 16 mars, à-propos mingled with couplets, with Guénée, 1856
 Si j'étais riche, comédie en vaudevilles in 1 act, with Guénée, 1856
 En avant, marche !, revue of the year1857, in 3 acts and 16 tableaux, La Guerre des saisons, prologue, with Guénée, 1857
 Petit Bonhomme vit encore, féerie in 15 tableaux, 1857
 Le Premier feu, comédie en vaudevilles in 1 act, with Guénée, 1857
 Jacquot Renchéri, parody in 3 tableaux, of the Fils naturel, with Émile Abraham, 1858
 La Jeunesse du jour, play mingled with songs, in 3 acts and 6 tableaux, with Eugène de Fère, 1858
 Tout Paris y passera, revue of the year 1858, in 3 acts and 14 tableaux, preceded by Paris sur scène, prologue, with Guénée, 1858
 Vingt ans ou la Vie d'un séducteur, drame-vaudeville in 5 acts, with Deslandes, 1858
 L'Éventail de Géraldine, comédie en vaudevilles in 1 act, with Ernest Mouchelet and Edgard Chanu, 1859
 Le Doigt dans l’œil, revue of the year 1860, in 3 acts and 20 tableaux, with Dunan Mousseux, 1860
 Les Leçons de Betzy, comédie en vaudevilles in 1 act, with Abraham, 1860
 Les Piliers de café, drame-vaudevilles in 4 acts, with Abraham and Eugène Hugot, 1861
 Les Trois ivresses, comédie en vaudevilles in 1 act, 1863

Bibliography 
 Pierre Larousse, Grand dictionnaire universel du XIXe siècle, 1866, (p. 1520)
 Alfred Mézières, Lettres, sciences, arts: Encyclopédie universelle du XXe, 1908, (p. 209)
 Henry Lyonnet, Dictionnaire des comédiens français (ceux d'hier), 1910
 Guy Dumur, Histoire des spectacles, 1965, (p. 1893)

19th-century French male actors
French male stage actors
19th-century French dramatists and playwrights
Male actors from Bordeaux
1806 births
1870 deaths
Writers from Bordeaux